Black and White America is the ninth studio album by American rock musician Lenny Kravitz, released on August 30, 2011. The album also produced six singles released in 2011 and 2012.

Background
On his official website, Kravitz stated, "I don't know what it's called yet, it felt like Negrophilia, and then... it felt like something else." On December 13, 2010 Kravitz announced that the new album was to be called Black and White America, and it would be his first album on Roadrunner Records/Atlantic Records under joint label Loud & Proud.

Lenny Kravitz traveled to Bahamas on an intent to finishing an album called Negrophilia, but then he "got inspired to write a completely different album." "I was channel-surfing in the Bahamas one night and came across this documentary," he recalled. "I don't remember what it was called, but it had all these people talking about President Obama— how they didn't approve of his being elected and wanted to take their country back, any way they could. I know that there's racism, but to hear people voice it in such a hateful way – I had to write a rebuttal." Kravitz "dreamed up" one song, "Push", while waiting to shoot a scene in the 2009 movie Precious, in which he played a nurse. The album's title track came about while Kravitz was watching another, more disturbing film.

Later, Kravitz stated that even when Black and White America was created during his intentions to make Negrophilia, rumours commenting that the former grown up from the latter were "wrong information on the Internet which I wish would go away.", finally saying that "this has nothing to do with Negrophilia."

As stated in an interview with The San Francisco Chronicle, Kravitz said that "The simplicity works for me. Being there that long put me at a place of peace and allowed me to focus on my art. That was really incredible." When asked by The Miami Herald about how Kravitz compared this new album with his past classics, he answered that "I can't compare any of my music. They all just stand for what they stand for; they're just individual pieces, you know what I mean? The only difference is they're new."

Kravitz announced on his official Facebook page that "Come On Get It", used in an NBA commercial in late 2010, would be the album's first single. The second single, titled "Stand", was released on Facebook, for iTunes; a video was released on YouTube and on Vevo on June 6. "Push" was released as the third single.

Promotion
Lenny Kravitz performed "Stand" on the Late Show with David Letterman.
On September 1, 2011, he performed "Rock Star City Life" on Late Night with Jimmy Fallon.

Critical reception

Upon its release, Black and White America received generally positive reviews. At Metacritic, which assigns a weighted mean rating out of 100 to reviews from mainstream critics, the album received an average score of 68, based on eight reviews, which indicates "generally favorable reviews". At AnyDecentMusic?, that collates critical reviews from more than 50 media sources, the album scored 6.2 points out of 10, based on 10 reviews.

Stephen Thomas Erlewine of Allmusic praised the album, saying "he (Kravitz) has come up with his best record in years, a shamelessly enjoyable piece of aural candy." American Songwriter said, "Black and White America is a laudable musical statement, and a much needed reminder of how prodigious Kravitz is at melding together rock and funk." Giving it a B rating, Mikael Wood of Entertainment Weekly described the album as "a melting pot of funk, soul, rock, and other made-in-the-USA genres, with songs about growing up biracial after civil rights (the '70s-inspired title track) and plenty of hopey-changey stuff (Stand, Push)."

Rolling Stone writer Anthony Decurtis commented "Kravitz is most gripping at his most personal, but he doesn't sustain that intensity. Still, each of these 16 songs succeeds on its own terms, which is a vision for America beyond the black and white divide." Remi of SoulBounce argued that "even as you play Lenny Bingo, marking off the familiar styles he dusts off over the course of the album, you'll find yourself weighing the 2011 editions pretty favorably against their progenitors." Melinda Newman of HitFix said "Though everything Kravitz does here is deeply rooted in his stellar guitar work and the beat, it's his most experimental album in years". She added "Like Marvin Gaye or Al Green, Kravitz is able to blend both the sensual and the spiritual." and described the album "robust, full and uplifting."

Ryan Reed of Paste Magazine added " Rumored to be the realization of his long-awaited "funk album," Black and White proves that half-accurate. Many moments rank high on the Kravitz funkiness chart, including the fantastic title track—which rides liquidy slap-bass and buzzing synth, fleshed out by interjections from glistening strings and horns... The "blacker" he gets, the better he gets". Chris Coplan of Consequence of Sound mentioned "As the son of a Jewish father and a black mother, Lenny Kravitz has spent a lifetime towing the line between races and understanding the very essence of duality. Now, for his ninth studio album Black and White America, Kravitz is applying those lessons learned by offering up an effort that balances his older rock output with more diversified sounds and cameos from two of rap's biggest names, Drake and Jay-Z".

Track listing
All lyrics written by Lenny Kravitz, except "Boongie Drop" co-written by Jay-Z, and "Sunflower" co-written by Drake; all music composed by Lenny Kravitz, except where noted.

 "Black and White America" – 4:35 (Kravitz, Craig Ross)
 "Come On Get It" – 4:26 (Kravitz, Ross)
 "In the Black" – 3:24
 "Liquid Jesus" – 3:28
 "Rock Star City Life" – 3:24 (Kravitz, Ross)
 "Boongie Drop" (featuring Jay-Z and DJ Military) – 3:49
 "Stand" – 3:20
 "Superlove" – 3:29 (Kravitz, Ross)
 "Everything" – 3:38
 "I Can't Be Without You" – 4:48
 "Looking Back on Love" – 5:36
 "Life Ain't Ever Been Better Than It Is Now" – 4:17
 "The Faith of a Child" – 4:06
 "Sunflower" (featuring Drake) – 4:14 (Kravitz, Swizz Beatz)
 "Dream" – 5:11
 "Push" – 4:23

Commercial performance
The album was more commercially successful in the European market, where it charted in the top ten in various countries, including a No. 1 debut in Germany and Switzerland. According to Oricon, Black and White America debuted at No. 20 selling 6,000 copies in Japan. The album debuted at No. 17 in the US, selling 20,145 copies. It has sold 61,000 copies in US since its release.

Charts and certifications

Weekly charts

Year-end charts

Certifications

Personnel
Band
Lenny Kravitz – vocals, acoustic guitar, electric guitar, piano, synthesizer, bass guitar, drums
Craig Ross – acoustic guitar, electric guitar
Harold Todd – saxophone
Trombone Shorty – trombone
Michael Hunter – trumpet
George Laks – keyboard

Production
Sy Kravitz – cover photo
Mathieu Bitton – art direction, design, photography, handclaps

References

External links
 Lenny Kravitz Gregory Town Sound Studio on Mix March 2010 Issue Cover

2011 albums
Lenny Kravitz albums
Albums produced by Lenny Kravitz
Albums produced by Swizz Beatz
Virgin Records albums